Code: Realize − Guardian of Rebirth is an otome visual novel video game developed by Otomate for PlayStation Vita, released in 2014 in Japan and in 2015 in North America and Europe. The game features a steampunk aesthetic and a cast of literary and historical figures, including Arsène Lupin, Abraham Van Helsing, Victor Frankenstein, Impey Barbicane, and Count Saint-Germain. A fan disc, Code: Realize − Future Blessings, was released on November 26, 2016. Aksys Games localized both games in English. A second fan disc, Code: Realize − Shirogane no Kiseki will be released for PlayStation 4 and PlayStation Vita in Japan. An anime television series adaptation by M.S.C aired from October 7 to December 23, 2017.

Plot
Cardia lives day to day isolated from the world in a restricted, abandoned mansion in order to fulfill her promise to her father. Her body carries a deadly poison that rots or melts anything that her skin touches - causing the locals to call her "monster". Her father tells her to stay away from people and falling in love, but he suddenly disappears. One day, her quiet solitude is interrupted when the Royal Guards break in to capture her. That's when she meets the chivalrous thief Arsène Lupin, who helps her break free from the Royal Guards. Cardia then finds herself on a journey with Lupin and his gang to locate her father and find a way to remove the poison from her body.

Characters

Cardia is a girl who carries a virulent poison within her body that melts everything she touches due to a crystal known as Horologium in her body, resulting her to be considered as a monster. She has lost all memories about herself since two years ago for exception of her father who told her to never fall in love and always stay at the mansion until the day he returns. Having lived an isolated life and feared as a monster by people, Cardia lacked emotions and knowledge of the world. On the verge of being captured by the English army, she is stolen away by Arséne Lupin. She then begins to work with Lupin and his allies to find her father and a way to remove the poison from her body so she can experience human touch and warmth.

Lupin is a great thief who enjoys causing problems and claims that there is nothing that cannot be stolen. Bright and optimistic, he is very confident. Backing that up are his thievery skills and his ability to take action. He was the one who stole Cardia away from the English army when she was about to be captured and now he has begun to work with her. He seems as if he has some sort of goal in mind. As the story progresses, he falls in love with Cardia. In the anime, he is Cardia's love interest.

Called Van (Van Helsing in localized version) by Lupin and his friends, he is a former member of the secret intelligence organization Twilight and widely known as the war hero for his part in the war against vampires. Possessing excellent combat skills, he is called the Human Weapon. If it is for his own goals, then he will use any method possible, and he has a side to him where he can be described as cold. Deep down, he grows to care for Lupin's gang, but doesn't show it openly. He is going after the head of Twilight, Finis, whom he holds a grudge against.

Nicknamed Fran (Victor in localized version) by his friends, he is an elite who holds the title of former Head Alchemist of the Imperial Court for the English Government. He has an unparalleled amount of knowledge and intelligence. However, he does not let that be overbearing as he is very gentle and kind. Due to some circumstances, he is now on a wanted list and the government is hunting him down. He joins Lupin's gang after discovering Cardia's Horologium, offering to help her find a way to remove her poison.

Impey is a genius engineer who aspires to find a way for people to go to the moon. He is friendly and upbeat, often setting the mood for the group. His downside is that he does push his luck sometimes. However, as an engineer his talent lies in high-end goods. Everything from Lupin’s small tools and automobile, all the way to a ship that flies in the sky, are all his specialty. Impey is also extraordinarily good at cooking. He falls in love with Cardia at first sight and since then often flirts with her.

Count Saint-Germain is a noble who has taken residence in the city of copper machines, London. Giving the simple reason of ‘this seems interesting’, he becomes the patron for Lupin and his allies, giving them both a place to stay as well as funding their activities. A complete gentleman, he has a gentle demeanor and constantly maintains a polite attitude. However, sometimes he disappear to somewhere unknown.

Nicknamed "Delly", he is a pureblood vampire child who is the sole survivor of the vampire royalty that was annihilated during the Vampire War. He used to be Van's disciple, and thus, felt betrayed when Van killed his parents and many of his kin. He swore vengeance against human race, his first act being retrieving back his clan's treasures. Upon reuniting with Van, he fought to avenge his kin, but was defeated. Sympathizing with the vampire boy, Cardia and the others decided to take him under their wing, with Delly agreeing as he sees it as an opportunity to kill his enemies.

Finis is the head of England’s secret intelligence organization Twilight. He claimed to be Isaac's son, making him Cardia's younger brother. However, his background and activities are shrouded in mystery. He targets Cardia because she's crucial to realize their father's plan. Even though he always refers Cardia as his sister, he has intense jealousy and envy against her because their father only loves her while neglecting him.

The queen of London who is closely acquainted with Fran and the one who put the bounty on him.

He is a private detective who came to London upon being summoned by Scotland Yard.

The father of Cardia and Finis, he is a famous scientist throughout England. The creator of Code:Realize.

Development
Code: Realize − Guardian of Rebirth was developed by Idea Factory's otome games branch Otomate. Character designs and illustrations were handled by Miko while Nao Kojima and Yū Nishimura wrote the scenario. It was first released on November 27, 2014 in Japan for PlayStation Vita and is rated CERO C. A fan disc titled  was released on November 26, 2016. A Nintendo Switch version was released in April 2020. It was announced at Otomate Party 2015 along with the announcement of Otomate's 12 new titles. The game features new routes and supplemental stories and routes are set after the different endings of the original game, allowing protagonists to spend time with the heroes. A PlayStation 4 release comprising both games, titled Code: Realize − Bouquet of Rainbows was released on August 24, 2017. Another fan disc titled Code: Realize − Silver Miracles just currently announced for both PlayStation Vita and PlayStation 4.

Whilst the previous two games have Cardia not voiced, in December 2016, the official blog of Otomate announced that Saori Hayami joined the franchise as the protagonist Cardia.

An English localisation by Aksys Games was released on October 20, 2015 for North America and Europe. They also plan to release the localisation of the fan disc and the PS4 version on March 30, 2018.

Music
In the fan disc, Mao performs the opening and first ending theme respectively titled "Brightness ~Eternal Pure White~" and "My Dearest", Kaori Oda performs the second ending theme titled , and SHOJI performs the third ending theme titled . Yoshie Isogai wrote all the song lyrics. Myu arranged and composited the songs for the first game. Hijiri Anze arranged and composed the opening and the first two ending songs while Naoyuki Osada did the third ending song. Team Entertainment produced the songs and Peak A Soul+ produced the BGMs. Oda also performs the theme song "Inorimegurite" on the Silver Miracle fan disc.

Other media

Anime

An anime adaptation produced by the studio M.S.C was broadcast starting from October 7 to December 23, 2017, on AT-X, Tokyo MX, Sun TV, TV Aichi, and BS11. Hideyo Yamamoto directed the series and Sayaka Harada handled the series composition. Aya Nakanishi adapted Miko's art for animation. Mia Regina performed the opening theme titled "Kalmia", while Saori Hayami performed the ending theme titled "Twinkle" under her character name Cardia. Crunchyroll streamed the series, while Funimation streamed a simuldub.

Stage musical
A Code: Realize stage musical was announced at the "Code: Realize Fantastic Party" event in April 2017.

Notes

References

External links
 
Official anime website 
Code: Realize − Guardian of Rebirth at Aksys Games

2017 anime television series debuts
2014 video games
Anime television series based on video games
AT-X (TV network) original programming
Funimation
Idea Factory franchises
Male harem anime and manga
Nintendo Switch games
Otome games
PlayStation 4 games
PlayStation Vita games
Romance video games
Video games developed in Japan
Visual novels